Coelopini is a tribe of kelp flies in the family Coelopidae.

Genera
Genus Coelopa Meigen, 1830
Subgenus Coelopa Meigen, 1830
Subgenus Fucomyia Haliday, 1837
Subgenus Neocoelopa Malloch, 1933

References

Coelopidae
Diptera tribes